The 2022 Internazionali di Tennis Città di Vicenza was a professional tennis tournament played on clay courts. It was the seventh edition of the tournament which was part of the 2022 ATP Challenger Tour. It took place in Vicenza, Italy between 23 and 29 May 2022.

Singles main-draw entrants

Seeds

 1 Rankings are as of 16 May 2022.

Other entrants
The following players received wildcards into the singles main draw:
  Salvatore Caruso
  Matteo Gigante
  Francesco Passaro

The following players received entry into the singles main draw as special exempts:
  Matteo Arnaldi
  Francesco Maestrelli

The following players received entry into the singles main draw as alternates:
  Luciano Darderi
  Daniel Dutra da Silva
  Nerman Fatić
  Alexis Galarneau
  Maxime Janvier
  Andrea Pellegrino

The following players received entry from the qualifying draw:
  Nicolás Barrientos
  Francisco Comesaña
  Kenny de Schepper
  Giovanni Fonio
  Ernests Gulbis
  Oleg Prihodko

The following player received entry as a lucky loser:
  Yan Bondarevskiy

Champions

Singles

 Andrea Pellegrino def.  Andrea Collarini 6–1, 6–4.

Doubles

 Francisco Comesaña /  Luciano Darderi def.  Matteo Gigante /  Francesco Passaro 6–3, 7–6(7–4).

References

Internazionali di Tennis Città di Vicenza
2022
Internazionali di Tennis Città di Vicenza
May 2022 sports events in Italy